Jean Manuel Machi (born February 1, 1982) is a Venezuelan professional baseball pitcher who is a free agent. He previously played in Major League Baseball (MLB) for the San Francisco Giants, Boston Red Sox and Seattle Mariners. He was with the Giants for their 2014 World Series win.

Career

Philadelphia Phillies
On February 22, 2000, Machi signed with the Philadelphia Phillies organization as an international free agent. He made his professional debut for the GCL Phillies in 2002, and posted a 1.00 ERA in 10 games. The following year, he pitched in 8 games for the Low-A Batavia Muckdogs, logging a 2-4 record and 4.78 ERA with 19 strikeouts in 32.0 innings pitched. Machi spent 2004 in the Venezuelan Summer League.

Tampa Bay Rays
On December 13, 2004, Machi was selected by the Tampa Bay Rays organization in the minor league phase of the Rule 5 draft. He split the 2005 season between the High-A Visalia Oaks and the Double-A Montgomery Biscuits, recording a cumulative 3-11 record and 6.36 ERA in 32 appearances. He returned to Montgomery the following year, and improved his performance, recording a 6-1 record and 2.64 ERA in 49 games. On October 15, 2006, Machi elected free agency.

Toronto Blue Jays
On October 31, 2006, Machi signed a minor league contract with the Toronto Blue Jays organization. He spent the 2007 season with the Double-A New Hampshire Fisher Cats, and posted a 2-4 record and 3.53 ERA in 48 games. He returned to New Hampshire in 2008 and logged a 2-6 record and 4.65 ERA with 51 strikeouts in 69.2 innings of work. On November 12, 2008, Machi was released by the Toronto organization.

Pittsburgh Pirates
On February 13, 2009, Machi signed a minor league contract with the Pittsburgh Pirates organization. He split the year between the Triple-A Indianapolis Indians and the Double-A Altoona Curve, accumulating a 3-4 record and 2.09 ERA in 41 appearances. For the 2010 season, Machi returned to Indianapolis and pitched to a 5-5 record and 3.92 ERA with 58 strikeouts in as many appearances. On November 6, 2010, he elected free agency.

San Francisco Giants
On February 9, 2011, Machi signed a minor league contract with the San Francisco Giants. He played in 3 games for the Triple-A Fresno Grizzlies before he was loaned to the Diablos Rojos del México of the Mexican League for the rest of the season. In 48 games with the Diablos, Machi recorded a 3-1 record and 2.30 ERA. He was assigned to Triple-A Fresno to begin the 2012 season, where he served as the team's closer.

On September 1, 2012, Machi was selected to the 40-man roster by the Giants and promoted to the major leagues for the first time. On September 3, Machi made his major league debut, against the Arizona Diamondbacks, pitching a perfect inning. He finished his rookie season with a 6.75 ERA in 8 major league games. In 2013, Machi made 51 appearances for the Giants out of the bullpen, pitching to a 2.38 ERA with 51 strikeouts in 53.0 innings of work.

At the start of the 2014 season, Machi picked up three relief wins in his team's first 15 games, becoming the first Giants pitcher to do so since Bob Shaw in 1964. He finished the year with a 7-1 record and 2.58 ERA in 71 appearances for the team. Machi hit some struggles in 2015, and was designated for assignment by the Giants on July 20, 2015, after posting a 5.14 ERA in 33 appearances.

Boston Red Sox
On July 28, 2015, Machi was claimed off waivers by the Boston Red Sox and starter Clay Buchholz was transferred from the 15- to the 60-day disabled list to make space for him on the 40-man roster. In 26 appearances for Boston, Machi recorded a 5.09 ERA with 20 strikeouts in 23.0 innings of work. On November 6, 2015, Machi was outrighted off of the 40-man roster and elected free agency the same day.

Chicago Cubs
On December 14, 2015, Machi signed a minor league contract with an invitation to spring training with the Chicago Cubs organization. After registering a 2-1 record and 3.68 ERA in 20 games for the Triple-A Iowa Cubs, Machi was released on June 5, 2016.

San Francisco Giants (second stint)
On June 16, 2016, Machi signed a minor league contract with the San Francisco Giants organization. He finished the year with the Triple-A Sacramento River Cats, posting a 2-2 record and 3.62 ERA in 28 appearances. On November 7, 2016, he elected free agency.

Seattle Mariners
On January 30, 2017, Machi signed a minor league contract with the Seattle Mariners organization. He started the season with the Triple-A Tacoma Rainiers, and the Mariners selected his contract on May 2. He was designated for assignment on May 13 after recording a 1.17 ERA in 5 appearances. He was outrighted to Tacoma and posted a 2-4 record and 3.44 ERA in 29 games for the team.

Chicago White Sox
On July 21, 2017, Machi was traded to the Chicago White Sox, along with fellow veteran pitcher Mark Lowe, in exchange for cash considerations. He was assigned to the Triple-A Charlotte Knights upon acquisition. In 12 appearances with Charlotte, Machi logged a 5-0 record and 3.60 ERA with 28 strikeouts in30.0 innings pitched. On October 2, 2017, Machi elected free agency.

Return to Diablos Rojos
On February 7, 2018, Machi signed with the Diablos Rojos del México of the Mexican Baseball League. He was released on July 2, after he recorded a 5-3 record and 5.20 ERA in 28 games.

Sugar Land Skeeters
On July 15, 2018, Machi signed with the Sugar Land Skeeters of the Atlantic League of Professional Baseball. In 22 games for the Skeeters, Machi registered an excellent 0.84 ERA with 21 strikeouts in 21.1 innings of work. He re-signed with the team on May 2, 2019, and was later released on June 28 after struggling to a 6.75 ERA in 25 appearances.

West Virginia Power
After spending the 2020 season out of baseball, on April 5, 2021, Machi signed with the West Virginia Power of the Atlantic League of Professional Baseball. In 11 relief appearances, Machi registered a 2–1 record, 5.23 ERA, and 14 strikeouts.

Sultanes de Monterrey
On July 8, 2021, Machi's contract was purchased by the Sultanes de Monterrey of the Mexican League. He was released following the season on October 20, 2021.

Personal life
On June 9, 2016, Machi was arrested in Des Moines, Iowa for public intoxication, and urinating in public.

See also
 List of Major League Baseball players from Venezuela

References

External links

Mexican Baseball League
Venezuelan Baseball League

1983 births
Altoona Curve players
Batavia Muckdogs players
Boston Red Sox players
Diablos Rojos del México players
Fresno Grizzlies players
Florida Complex League Phillies players
Indianapolis Indians players
Iowa Cubs players
Living people
Major League Baseball pitchers
Major League Baseball players from Venezuela
Mexican League baseball pitchers
Montgomery Biscuits players
Navegantes del Magallanes players
New Hampshire Fisher Cats players
People from El Tigre
Sacramento River Cats players
San Francisco Giants players
Seattle Mariners players
Sugar Land Skeeters players
Tacoma Rainiers players
Toros del Este players
Venezuelan expatriate baseball players in the Dominican Republic
Venezuelan expatriate baseball players in Mexico
Venezuelan expatriate baseball players in the United States
Venezuelan Summer League Phillies players
West Virginia Power players
Visalia Oaks players